Sir Nicholas Jeremy Monck, KCB (9 March 1935 – 14 August 2013) was an English civil servant.

Biography
Monck was educated at King's College, Cambridge and after National Service in the Royal Horse Artillery he then studied at the University of Pennsylvania and the London School of Economics. He entered the Ministry of Power in 1959. From 1966 to 1969, he was a senior economist to the Tanzanian government. Returning to civil service in 1969, he worked in HM Treasury and was principal private secretary to the Chancellor of the Exchequer from 1976 to 1977. He was deputy secretary with responsibility for industry from 1984 to 1990, then Second Permanent Secretary with responsibility for public expenditure from 1990 to 1992. From 1993 to his retirement in 1995, he was Permanent Secretary of the Department for Employment.

He is buried on the eastern side of Highgate Cemetery.

References

Further reading 
Michael Frayn, "Sir Nicholas Monck Obituary", The Guardian, 12 September 2013.

1935 births
2013 deaths
Burials at Highgate Cemetery
English civil servants
Alumni of King's College, Cambridge
Knights Companion of the Order of the Bath